David Wing Jr. (June 24, 1766 – September 13, 1806) was a Vermont public official whose service in government included four years as Secretary of State of Vermont.

Biography
David Wing Jr. was born in Rochester, Massachusetts on June 24, 1766.  He was educated in Rochester and became a farmer and school teacher.  In 1790, he moved to Montpelier, Vermont, as did his father and several other family members.

Wing continued to farm and teach school, and became a merchant.  He was soon called to serve in local and state government.  In 1795, he was appointed town clerk, and he served until his death.  From 1797 to 1806 he also served as a town selectman; he also held other positions in the town government, including auditor and lister.  He served in the Vermont House of Representatives from 1797 to 1801, and was instrumental in obtaining approval to make Montpelier the state capital.  An adherent of the Federalist Party, from 1802 to 1806, Wing served as Vermont's Secretary of State.

Montpelier was part of Caledonia County until the formation of Washington County; when the Caledonia County court was organized in 1797, Wing was elected one of the first side judges.  He served until 1803, when he advanced to presiding judge, and he served as presiding judge from 1804 until his death.

Death and burial
Wing died of typhus in Montpelier on September 13, 1806.  He was buried at Elm Street Cemetery in Montpelier.

Family
In 1792, Wing married Hannah Davis, a daughter of Colonel Jacob Davis, one of Montpelier's founders.  They were the parents of eight children: Debby Daphne, Christopher Columbus, Algernon Sidney, Marcus Tullius Cicero, Maria Theresa, David Davis, Carolina Augusta, and Maximus Fabius.

References

Sources

Books

Internet
 

1766 births
1806 deaths
People from Rochester, Massachusetts
People from Montpelier, Vermont
Members of the Vermont House of Representatives
Vermont state court judges
Secretaries of State of Vermont
Burials in Vermont